The Corps des mines is the foremost technical Grand Corps of the French State (grands corps de l'Etat). It is composed of the state industrial engineers. The Corps is attached to the French Ministry of Economy and Finance. Its purpose is to entice French students in mathematics and physics to serve the government and train them for executive careers in France.

Members are educated at the École nationale supérieure des mines de Paris, also known as Mines ParisTech. Each year, the Corps recruits between 10 and 20 members. Most of them are alumni from École polytechnique, who are usually among the top ranked students, others come from École normale supérieure (ENS), Télécom Paris or regular graduates of the Mines ParisTech. Upon graduation, Corps des mines engineers hold executive positions in the French administration.

Corps des mines engineers tend to hold top executive positions in France's major industrial companies in the course of their career.

Being admitted to the Corps des mines program is considered a significant fast-track for executive careers in France.

Missions

Corps des Mines engineers contribute to the conception, implementation and evaluation of public policies in the fields of:

industry and economy
energy and natural resources
information and communication technologies
environment sustainability, industrial safety and public health
research, innovation and new technologies
land use planning and transportation
standardization and metrology
banking, insurance and financial services

Corps des Mines engineers typically hold high-level technical or executive positions in various ministries or international organizations. 
After serving in the administration, part of the Corps des Mines engineers transfer to the private sector, where they hold top executive positions in large industrial companies.

Recruitment and training

Corps des Mines engineers are recruited among the top students from École polytechnique, École normale supérieure, École nationale supérieure des mines de Paris and Télécom ParisTech. About twenty engineers enroll every year. During the course of their training, the Corps des Mines engineers have to complete two one-year positions in private companies (one in France and one abroad), followed by a one-year training in public administration, hosted at École nationale supérieure des mines de Paris.

The main aim of the training is to provide theoretical and practical knowledge about how companies operate, together with a sound understanding of government responsibilities in the technical and economic fields.

Notable members

These  are listed by chronological order of birthdate. 

 Armand Dufrénoy (1792-1857)
 Gabriel Lamé (1795-1870)
 Élie de Beaumont (1798-1874)
 Émile Clapeyron (1799-1864), one of the founder of thermodynamics
 Michel Chevalier (1806-1879)
 Frédéric le Play (1806-1882)
 Henri Victor Regnault (1810-1878)
 Louis Le Chatelier (1815-1873)
 Charles-Eugène Delaunay (1816-1872)
 Achille Delesse (1817-1881)
 Charles de Freycinet (1828-1923), prime minister of France at the end of the 19th century
 Camille Jordan (1838-1922)
 Henry Le Chatelier (1850-1936), chemist
 Henry Küss (1852-1914)
 Henri Poincaré (1854-1912), Nineteenth century mathematician and scientist
 Édouard Estaunié (1862-1942)
 Georges Friedel (1865-1933)
 Alfred-Marie Liénard (1869-1958)
 Albert Lebrun (1871-1950), president of France during the 3rd republic
 Conrad Schlumberger (1878-1936), founder with his brother Marcel of the Société de Prospection Electrique, that became later Schlumberger Limited
 Georges Painvin (1886-1980)
 Paul Lévy (1886-1971)
 Léon Daum (1887-1966)
 Louis Armand (1905-1971)
 Pierre Guillaumat (1909-1991)
 Maurice Allais (1911-2010), 1988 Nobel Memorial Prize in Economic Sciences
 Maurice Lauré (1917-2001)
 Jacques Friedel (1921-2014)
 Claude Bloch (1923-1971)
 Pierre Laffitte (1925-2021)
  (1925-1997)
 Georges Besse (1927-1986)
 Robert Dautray (1928)
 Yves Jeannin (1931)
 Roger Balian (1933)
 Gérard Théry (1933-2021)
 Charles-Michel Marle (1934)
 Lionel Stoléru (1937-2016)
 Francis Mer (1939), former CEO of Usinor and former Minister of Finances
 Jean-Louis Beffa (1941), CEO of Saint-Gobain
 Didier Lombard (1942)
 Bertrand Collomb (1942-2019)
 Thierry de Montbrial (1943)
 Jacques Attali (1943)
 Jacques Vernier (1944)
 Thierry Desmarest (1945), former CEO of TotalEnergies
 Noël Forgeard (1946), former CEO of Airbus and EADS
 Gérard Berry (1946)
 Jean-Martin Folz (1947), former CEO of PSA Peugeot Citroën
 Jean-Louis Masson (1947)
 Pierre Pringuet (1950), former CEO of Pernod Ricard
 Denis Ranque (1952), Chairman of Airbus, former CEO of Thales Group
 Jacques Biot (1952), former president of École Polytechnique
 Patrick Kron (1953)
 François Loos (1953)
 Jacques Aschenbroich (1954), CEO of Valeo
 Jean-Bernard Lévy (1955), CEO of Électricité de France
 Laurence Danon (1956)
 Jean-Baptiste Leblond (1957)
 Jean-Pierre Clamadieu (1958), CEO of Solvay, Chairman of Rhodia
 Hervé Mariton (1958)
 Anne Lauvergeon (1959), former CEO of Areva
 Luc Oursel (1959-2014)
 Jean-Laurent Bonnafé (1961), CEO of BNP Paribas
 Fabrice Brégier (1961)
 Pascale Sourisse (1962)
 Michel Combes (1962)
 Patrick Pouyanné (1963), CEO of Total
 François Bourdoncle (1964)
 Laure de La Raudière (1966)
 Thierry Garnier (1966)
 Isabelle Kocher (1966), former CEO of Engie
 Nicolas Véron (1971)
 Nicolas Mayer-Rossignol (1977)
 Alfred Galichon (1977)

References

 
mines
French mining engineers
Mines